Glenfarg railway station served the village of Glenfarg, Perth and Kinross, Scotland, from 1890 to 1964, on the Glenfarg Line.

History 
The station opened on 2 June, 1890, by the North British Railway. To the west was the goods yard and north of the northbound platform was the signal box. To the north of the southbound platform was a refuge siding. The line was tough to use with steam locomotives so diesel locomotives were trialed in the 1920s. The station closed on 15 June 1964. The line was closed in 1970 and the route used for M90 motorway.

References

External links 

Disused railway stations in Perth and Kinross
Former North British Railway stations
Railway stations in Great Britain opened in 1890
Railway stations in Great Britain closed in 1964
1890 establishments in Scotland
1964 disestablishments in Scotland
Beeching closures in Scotland